Golam Wahed Choudhury (1926 – 13 December 1997), also known as G. W. Choudhury, was a political scientist and diplomat from East Pakistan, which later became Bangladesh. He worked as the Director General of the Research Division of the Pakistani foreign ministry and later as Pakistan's Minister of Communications. After the separation of Bangladesh, he returned to academic work. He authored several books on Pakistan's international relations, and taught at the University of Dhaka, Royal Institute of International Affairs (England), Columbia University and other institutions.

Background and education
Choudhury was born in 1926 at Madaripur District in then Bengal Presidency, British India (now Bangladesh) to Golam Mawla Choudhury and Fatima Choudhury. Fatima's father, Ibrahim Saber, was Begum Rokeya’s eldest brother. Golam obtained his bachelor's in 1945 and master's in 1948 in political science from the University of Calcutta. He earned his PhD from Columbia University in 1956.

Career
In 1948, Choudhury joined the department of international relations faculty of the University of Dhaka as a lecturer and later the department of political science.

He joined Pakistan's foreign ministry in 1967 as director-general of the Research Division. Prior to that, he was involved with the formulation of the 1965 Tashkent Agreement with India. From 1969 to 1971, he was the Minister of Communications in the Government of Pakistan. He made proposals for establishing a confederation between East Pakistan and West Pakistan.

After the separation of East Pakistan as Bangladesh in 1971, Choudhury went into exile. He worked at the Royal Institute of International Affairs in England, and later at Columbia University in New York. He also taught at North Carolina Central University and Duke University. He returned to Dhaka in 1985, but continued his association with Columbia University as an adjunct professor till 1994.

Selected works

Reception 
Richard L. Park, in reviewing Pakistan's Relations with India, 1947-1966, noted that Choudhury's interest is in portraying Pakistan's point of view. The book selectively quotes evidence and authorities that support Pakistan's position.

Norman Palmer sees the study as fullest and "most satisfactory" in its coverage of the historical context, the partition of India and the first decade of relations between India and Pakistan. While Palmer understands the author's "pro-Pakistani bias" he notes that the analysis is scholarly with the sole exception of the coverage to the 1965 India-Pakistan war.

Wayne Wilcox reviews the book as a well-written "defense lawyer's brief" which gathers a large amount of evidence to convince the jury. Wilcox notes that being written at Cambridge, the book exercises a restrained tone which shows "some detachment".

Personal life and death 
Choudhury was married to Dilara Choudhury, a professor of political science at Jahangirnagar University, Savar. Together they had two sons, Golam Mabud and Golam Sayeed. Choudhury created the Golam Mowla Fatima Trust and established a number of charitable institutions in Madaripur district.

Choudhury died, aged 71, on 13 December 1997 at Georgetown University Hospital in Washington, D.C.

References

Further reading 

 
 
 
 
 
 
 
 
 
 

1926 births
1997 deaths
People from Madaripur District
University of Calcutta alumni
Academic staff of the University of Dhaka
Columbia University faculty
Date of birth missing
Bangladeshi political scientists
20th-century political scientists